Joseph Rabinowitz (23 September 1837 – 17 May 1899) was a Russian missionary to the Jews, who founded the Hebrew Christian movement Novy Israel in 1882.

Biography 
Rabinowitz was born on 23 September 1837 in Resina, Bessarabia. He was brought up as a Ḥasid, but later acquired some secular knowledge and mastered the Russian language. For a time he practised law in the lower courts of his native town, settling subsequently in Kishinev. 

In 1882 he founded the movement Novy Israel, and began to preach Christianity to the Jews of Kishinev. Following immediately upon the founding of the Bibleitzy brotherhood by Jacob Gordin at Elizabethgrad, the new movement attracted much attention, and was freely discussed in Russian newspapers. Rabinowitz succeeded for a time in interesting Christian Hebraist Franz Delitzsch in his movement and in allaying the suspicions of the Russian government, which strictly prohibited the formation of new religious movement and was called sect. But his open conversion to Protestantism had the natural result of estranging many of his followers. He was baptized in Berlin on 24 March 1885.

He died in Kishinev on 17 May 1899.

Publications
 
 Ketuvim le-yeshurun. Published in French as

References
 
  English translation:

Citations

1837 births
1899 deaths
Converts to Christianity from Judaism
Expatriates in Ottoman Palestine
Moldavian Jews
Bessarabian Jews
Jews in Ottoman Palestine
Messianic Jews
People from Rezina District
Hebrew Christian movement
Russian Christians
Russian Christian missionaries
Russian Jews